Kwahu Easter is the annual Easter celebrations at the Kwahu South District of the Eastern Region of Ghana.
People from all walks of life and all nationality throng to the Kwahu Hills every Easter to celebrate the three-day-long holiday.

Activities
Activities include paragliding, hiking, carnivals and street jams. For Kwahu people, it is an annual homecoming, but for holiday revelers it is an occasion for celebrations. There are also performances by various artists.

Paragliding
In 2005 the Ministry of Tourism began a paragliding activity as part of the line up events for the Easter celebrations. Kwahu Easter is a place of interest where tourist visit, typically for its inherent or exhibited cultural value, historical significance, natural or built beauty, or amusement opportunities.

References

Festivals in Ghana
Easter traditions